"Soul Power" is a song by James Brown. Brown recorded it with the original J.B.'s (plus Fred Wesley) and it was released as a three-part single in 1971. Like "Get Up (I Feel Like Being a) Sex Machine" and other hits from this period it features backing vocals by Bobby Byrd. It charted #3 R&B and #29 Pop.

Part 1 of "Soul Power" appeared on the 1972 album Soul Classics. Live versions of the song were included on Revolution of the Mind (1971) and Love Power Peace (1992; recorded 1971), but no longer version of the original studio recording received an album release until an eight-minute re-edit was issued on the 1986 compilation album In the Jungle Groove. The complete studio recording, over 12 minutes long, appeared for the first time on the 1996 CD compilation Funk Power 1970: A Brand New Thang.

Personnel
 James Brown - lead vocal
with The J.B.'s
 Bobby Byrd - organ, vocals
 Darryl "Hasaan" Jamison - trumpet
 Clayton "Chicken" Gunnells - trumpet
 Fred Wesley - trombone
 St. Clair Pinckney - tenor saxophone
 Phelps "Catfish" Collins - guitar
 Bobby Roach - guitar
 William "Bootsy" Collins - bass
 John "Jabo" Starks - drums
 Johnny Griggs - congas

Soul Power 74

In 1974, Brown created an instrumental version of "Soul Power" by having Maceo Parker and Fred Wesley overdub new horn parts onto the rhythm track of the original recording. Sound engineer Bob Both added sound effects at several points to conceal where the original horn track had bled through into the rhythm parts. Titled "Soul Power 74" and credited to "Maceo and the Macks", the new version was released as a two-part single on People Records and charted #20 R&B and #109 Bubbling Under Pop. It also appeared on the album Us!.

Cover versions and sampling
 Alternative rock band the Smashing Pumpkins covered "Soul Power" on their 2000 album Machina II/The Friends & Enemies of Modern Music.
 Rapper Chuck D performed it on his 2007 tribute album Tribb to JB.
 Soul band Tower of Power has performed "Soul Power" as an extended ending/jam to their popular hit "What Is Hip?".

Both the "Soul Power" and "Soul Power 74" have been extensively sampled in hip hop music and other genres. "Soul Power 74" was sampled on Redman's "Rated R", MC Breed and 2Pac's "Gotta Get Mine", Spoonie Gee's "The Godfather", Black Machine's "How Gee" and Usher's "Ride" (later re-made by Jennifer Lopez as "Get Right"), among many others.

Appearances in other media
"Soul Power 74" is featured in the video game Grand Theft Auto: San Andreas on the radio station Master Sounds 98.3.

References

External links
 [ Song Review] at AllMusic
 List of songs that sample "Soul Power"

Songs about soul
James Brown songs
Songs written by James Brown
The J.B.'s songs
1971 singles
1974 singles
King Records (United States) singles
1971 songs